Sidho Kanho Birsha University (SKBU) is a public state university located in Purulia district of West Bengal, India. It was established under an Act of the West Bengal Legislature on April, 2010. It offers different undergraduate and postgraduate courses in liberal arts.

History 
The university was founded on 6 July 2010 by the Sidho Kanho Brisha University Act, 2010, passed by the West Bengal Legislature.Jagannath Kishore College, Purulia donated 13 acres to the university for the establishment. The university is named for three rebels who put up resistance against British rule: Sidhu Murmu, Kanhu Murmu, and Birsa Munda.

Tapati Mukherjee was appointed as the first vice-chancellor of this university. One of the important focus of this university is to promote and protect indigenous culture and language — especially the Santali language. Its post-graduate departments started functioning from the 2011-12 session with 12 academic departments (Bengali, English, Sanskrit, Santali, History, Political Science, Philosophy, Education, Physics, Chemistry, Mathematics & Commerce). Over the years in an expansive and forward-looking drive, they grew to 19 departments with the introduction to Economics, Sociology, Tribal Studies, Geography, Zoology, Botany & Psychology department, many of which are in the frontier areas of Science and Social Sciences.

Campus and Location
The total area of university campuses in the semi-rural areas is 12.86 acres. This land is donated by Jagannath Kishore College, Purulia.

The campus is located in the Purulia district, beside the Purulia-Ranchi national highway (NH 32). It is 7 Km from the Purulia railway station and 3 Km from the Purulia central bus stand. Ajodhya Hills is prominently visible from the university campus.

Organisation and administration

Governance
The Vice-chancellor of the Sidho Kanho Birsha University is the chief executive officer of the university. Dipak Kumar Kar is the current Vice-chancellor of the university.

Faculties and Departments
Sidho Kanho Birsha University has 22 departments organized into three faculties: Science, Arts, and Commerce. 

 Faculty of Science

This faculty consists of the departments of Botany, Physics, Chemistry, Mathematics, Computer Science, Psychology, Geography, and Zoology.

 Faculty of Arts and Social Science

This faculty consists of the departments of Anthropology and Tribal Studies, Bengali, English, Economics, Education, History, Political Science, Philosophy, Journalism and Mass Communication, Sanskrit, Santali, Kudmali, and Sociology.

 Faculty of Commerce

This faculty consists of the departments of  Commerce, and  Master of Business Administration (MBA).

Affiliations
Sidho Kanho Birsha University (SKBU) is an affiliating university with jurisdiction over the colleges of the Purulia district. The university has 31 colleges. Among them 21 are degree colleges and ten are B.Ed. colleges and professional colleges:

Academics

Admission
One has to pass higher secondary (10+2) and graduation (10+2+3) levels for admission to undergraduate and postgraduate courses of the university. For Ph.D. level admission, One has to qualify National Eligibility Test (NET) examination or Research qualifying test (RET) conducted by the University.

Diploma and Certificate Courses
Besides different undergraduate and postgraduate courses, SKBU also offers different diploma and certificate courses. 
These courses are generally of shorter duration compared to degree-level courses. Specifically, it offers one-year diploma courses in Chhau dance (Indian semi-classical folk dance of this region) and Jhumur (folk song of this region). It also offers six-month certificate courses on different topics to preserve the indigenous identity of this locality. This is the only university that offers certificate courses in Kudmali language and Santali Scriptology.

Accreditation
Sidho Kanho Birsha University (SKBU) has been awarded B+ grade by the National Assessment and Accreditation Council (NAAC).

References

 
Memorials to Birsa Munda
Educational institutions established in 2010
Universities and colleges in Purulia district
2010 establishments in West Bengal